Arabineura khalidi is a species of damselfly in the family Protoneuridae. It is found in Oman and United Arab Emirates. Its natural habitat is rivers. It is threatened by habitat loss.

References

Protoneuridae
Insects described in 1988
Taxonomy articles created by Polbot